Costas Rigas ,(born March 29, 1944 in Greece), is a retired Greek pro basketball player, and a former pro basketball referee. Rigas is a member of the EuroLeague's 50 greatest contributors. In 2013, he was enshrined into the FIBA Hall of Fame.

Playing career
Rigas played club basketball with Amyntas, in Greece. He also played with the youth national team of Greece, in one game.

Reffing career
In 1977, Rigas became an international referee, and throughout his career, he refereed 23 title games. Highlights of his reffing career are the 1984 Summer Olympic Games final, the 1986 FIBA World Championship title game, the 1992 Summer Olympic Games women's final, four EuroLeague Finals (1984, 1985, 1986, 1991), and 4 Korać Cup title games.

Later, he was named the EuroLeague's director of referees.

References

External links 
EuroLeague referee nominees

1944 births
Living people
Amyntas B.C. players
Basketball referees
EuroLeague referees
FIBA Hall of Fame inductees
Greek men's basketball players
Basketball players from Athens